Runcible Jones: The Buried City is the second novel of the Runcible Jones Quintet featuring the magical adventures of Runcible Jones and his fey friend Mariam Orpiment, written by the author Ian Irvine.

Plot summary 

Runcible and Mariam are back and they are in big trouble. Lord Shambles has returned, stronger than ever before and once he finds the lost Citadel of Magic there will be no defence against his evil sorcery. To put a stop Lord Shambles, the children must journey to Iltior and descend to the uttermost pole. But even if they find the Codex of Dreadful Spells, Runcible still has to unravel the mystery of the tainted children, then face his most terrifying nightmare, the sting of the giant scorpion. The Buried City is book two of the Runcible Jones series.

External links 
 Runcible Jones Official Website

2007 Australian novels
Young adult fantasy novels
Australian young adult novels
Novels by Ian Irvine